PS Kamasan is an Indonesian football club based in Manokwari Regency. They play in the Liga 3. Their home stadium is Sanggeng Stadium.

Honours
Liga 3 West Papua
Runners-up (1): 2021

Players

References

External links

Football clubs in Indonesia
Football clubs in West Papua (province)
Manokwari Regency
1986 establishments in Indonesia
Association football clubs established in 1986